The district councils, formerly district boards until 1999, are the local councils for the 18 districts of Hong Kong.

History

Before establishment

An early basis for the delivery of local services were the Kaifong associations, set up in 1949.  However, by the 1960s, these had ceased to represent local interests, and so, in 1968, the government established the first local administrative structure with the city district offices, which were intended to enable it to mobilise support for its policies and programmes, such as in health and crime-reduction campaigns. An aim was also to monitor the grass roots, following the 1967 riots.

Under the Community Involvement Plan, launched in the early 1970s, Hong Kong and Kowloon were divided into 74 areas, each of around 45,000 people.  For each, an 'area committee' of twenty members was then appointed by the city district officers, and was comprised, for the first time, of members from all sectors of the local community, led by an unofficial member of the Legislative Council (Legco). The initial purpose was to help implement the 'Clean Hong Kong' campaign, by distributing publicity material to local people. This was held to be a success.

A next stage in the government's effort to increase local engagement and influence was the setting up, in June 1973, of mutual aid committees (MACs) in high-rise residential buildings.  These were described in Legco as "a group of responsible citizens, resident in the same multi-storey building who work together to solve common problems of cleanliness and security."  In fact, they were tightly controlled by the government.  With government encouragement, the number of such committees increased rapidly in these private buildings, from 1,214 in 1973 to 3,463 in 1980. The scheme was extended to public housing estates, of which 800 had MACs in 1980, as well as factories and in the New Territories.

The next development was the establishment of eight district advisory boards in the districts of the New Territories, starting with Tsuen Wan in 1977. The boards, whose members were appointed, were more formally constituted than the city district boards, charged with advising on local matters, recommending minor district works, and conducting cultural and recreational activities.

Establishment to present
Then in 1982, under the governorship of Sir Murray MacLehose, the district boards were established under the District Administration Scheme. The aim was to improve co-ordination of government activities in the provision of services and facilities at the district level and the boards initially took over the roles of the district advisory boards.

At first, the boards comprised only appointed members and government officials, but from 1982, a proportion of each was elected. In an attempt to inject a democratic element into the Legislative Council, the government introduced a model where some legislators were elected indirectly by members of the district councils. Twelve legislators were returned by an 'electoral college' of district councillors in 1985. The practice was repeated in 1988 and 1995.

After the HKSAR was established in 1997, as part of the "through train", the district boards became provisional district boards, composed of all the original members of the boards supplemented by others appointed by the chief executive. (Under the British administration, the Governor had refrained from appointing any member.)

Later in early 1999 a bill was passed in the Legislative Council providing mainly for the establishment, composition and functions of the District Councils, which would replace the Provisional District Boards.  The 27 ex officio seats of Rural Committees, abolished by the colonial authorities, were reinstated. The government rejected any public survey or referendum on the issue, saying that it had been studying the issue since 1997, and had received 98 favourable submissions.  The self-proclaimed pro-democracy camp dubbed the move "a setback to the pace of democracy" because it was a throwback to the colonial era.

In 2010, the government proposed that five legislators be added to district council functional constituencies, and be elected by proportional representation of elected DC members. In a politically controversial deal between the Democratic Party and the Beijing government, this was changed to allow the five seats to be elected by those members of the general electorate who did not otherwise have a functional constituency vote.

Under the district councillor appointment system, 102 district councillors out of 534 were picked by the Chief Executive, while the remainder were democratically elected by voters in each district. The system was abolished in 2013, and the new District Councils after the 2015 election no longer have appointed members.

Operation

Functions 
The councils are mandated to advise the Government on the following:

 matters affecting the well-being of people in the District;
 the provision and use of public facilities and services within the District;
 the adequacy and priorities of Government programmes for the District;
 the use of public funds allocated to the District for local public works and community activities; and

District councils also undertake the following within the respective districts with its available funds allocated by the government:

 environmental improvements;
 the promotion of recreational and cultural activities; and
 community activities

Councils 

There is a district council for each of the following eighteen districts. The number in parentheses corresponds to the number shown on the map at the right.

Composition 
There were a total of 479 district council members in the sixth District Councils. Except 27 ex-officio seats occupied by Chairmen of Rural Committees in the New Territories, all were returned by direct election, each from the constituencies in the 18 districts by a "First past the post" system.

District Boards were chaired by District officers between 1982 and 1985. Since then chairmen of District Boards (later District Councils after handover of Hong Kong) are elected from amongst the members.

Source: Review of the Roles, Functions and Composition

Political make-up of the councils

Independence 
The party affiliations and politics in the Legislative Council can be echoed in the district councils, who have sometimes been accused of slavishly supporting the government. Professor Li Pang-kwong, of Lingnan University, says that the problematic framework of the councils, being under the Home Affairs Bureau, has led them to work too closely with the government. He cites the example of the "copy and paste" Queen's Pier motions passed by thirteen councils to support government decisions as a rubber-stamp, and a clear sign that councils lacked independence. Li recalled a similar government "consultation" on universal suffrage in 2007, in which two-thirds of the councils passed a vote in support of its position. After it was revealed that the government was behind the concerted district councils' motions in 2008 supporting the relocation of Queen's Pier, Albert Ho condemned the government for tampering with district councils to "create public opinion", and for turning district officers into propagandists.

Elections

1999 District council elections 

In 1999, Tung Chee Hwa appointed 100 members to the district councils. These included 41 from various political parties, namely the Liberal Party, the Democratic Alliance for the Betterment and Progress of Hong Kong (DAB), and the Hong Kong Progressive Alliance. No democrats were appointed.

2003 District council elections 

In 2003, Tung appointed 21 political party appointees to the district councils to dilute the influence of the pan-democrats as follows:
 eight members of the Liberal Party
 six members of the DAB
 six members from the Progressive Alliance
 one from the New Century Forum

Professor of politics and sociology at Lingnan University, Dr. Li Pang-kwong said "As in the past, most of the appointees were pro-government or persons without a clear political stance... ensur[ing] that no district council is in the hands of the democrats." A spokesman for the democrats said the appointees "will have an unfair advantage in that they are getting financial support from the government which will help them run for office in future elections." After this election, this election would abolish the appointed members of the Hong Kong district councils.

2007 District council elections 

In December 2007, Donald Tsang named 27 government-appointed council members.
 13 members of the Liberal Party
 11 members of the DAB
 three members from the Federation of Trade Unions

Tsang was criticised for not appointing a single member of the pan-democrats in either 2003 or 2007.

2011 District council elections 

After the election, Donald Tsang appointed 68 members, none of them from the pan-democrat camp.

2015 District council elections

2019 District council elections

See also
 Districts of Hong Kong
 Legislative Council of Hong Kong
 Politics of Hong Kong
 Pro-Beijing camp
 Pro-democracy camp

References
 De Golyer, Michael (13 October 2005). Building a backbone, Commentary, The Standard.

Footnotes

External links

 District Councils official website

Politics of Hong Kong